James A. Holstein is an American sociologist who is emeritus professor of sociology at Marquette University. He was the editor-in-chief of Social Problems from 2002 to 2005.

References

External links

Living people
American sociologists
Marquette University faculty
University of California, Berkeley alumni
University of Michigan alumni
Academic journal editors
Year of birth missing (living people)